Thomas Western may refer to:

 Thomas Western (Royal Navy officer) (1761-1814) British admiral
 Sir Thomas Western, 1st Baronet (1795–1873), British Liberal politician, Member of Parliament (MP) for North Essex 1865–1868, illegitimate son of the above
 Sir Thomas Western, 2nd Baronet (1821–1877), English Liberal Party politician